Matthew Levin may refer to:

 Matt Levin, American racing driver
 Matthew Levin (chef), American celebrity chef
 Matthew Levin (diplomat), Canadian diplomat

See also
Matthew Levine (disambiguation)